Bethesda University is a private Christian university in Anaheim, California. It was founded in 1976 by David Yonggi Cho. The university is accredited by the Association for Biblical Higher Education and the Transnational Association of Christian Colleges and Schools and it is approved by the Bureau for Private Postsecondary Education of the State of California.

Athletics
Bethesda University is a member of the National Christian College Athletic Association (NCCAA). Their men's basketball team was a member of the now defunct Pacific Christian Athletic Conference (PCAC). They currently have five intercollegiate sports teams made up of men and women's soccer, men and women's basketball, and baseball. The Flames, as they are known, have enjoyed some success in athletics in the past few years. Both women's basketball and baseball have reached the NCCAA's national tournament championship game in 2015 and 2016. Men's soccer has also made national tournament appearances in 2015 and 2016. However, the most prominent accomplishment for their athletics program comes from the men's basketball team. In 2016 and 2021, BU men's basketball, led by Filipino coach Leo Balayon, became only the second non-NCAA/NAIA program in history to upset an NCAA Division 1 program twice when it defeated Cal State Northridge of the Big West Conference on two occasions. They are the only program to accomplish this historic feat in the Western United States. Former men's basketball head coach Leo Balayon is the only coach in history to lead a non-NCAA/NAIA program to two upset victories against an NCAA D1 opponent. Balayon is the first individual, born and raised in the Philippines, to become a head men's basketball coach in the United States.

References

Universities and colleges in Orange County, California
Sports teams in Anaheim, California
Transnational Association of Christian Colleges and Schools
Seminaries and theological colleges in California